Kerdabad (also Romanized as Kerdābād; also known as Kerdābād-e Pūr Valī and Kīrdābād) is a village in Hajjilu Rural District, in the Central District of Kabudarahang County, Hamadan Province, Iran. At the 2006 census, its population was 2,312, in 565 families.

References 

Populated places in Kabudarahang County